William Crook may refer to:
William H. Crook (1839–1915), one of Abraham Lincoln's presidential bodyguards and longtime White House employee
William Crook (politician) (1925–1997), American politician, US Ambassador to Australia
William Pascoe Crook (1775–1846), missionary, schoolmaster and pastor
Billy Crook (American soccer) (born 1964)
Billy Crook (English footballer) (1926–2011)

See also
Billy Crook (disambiguation)
William Crooke (disambiguation)
William Croke (disambiguation)